Alanthus is an unincorporated community in Culpeper County, Virginia, United States.

References

Unincorporated communities in Virginia
Unincorporated communities in Culpeper County, Virginia